Manipur Cricket Association is the governing body for cricket in the state of Manipur in India and organizes the Manipur cricket team. It is affiliated to the Board of Control for Cricket in India as a full member.

There is only one cricket stadium in Manipur, the Luwangpokpa Cricket Stadium in Imphal.

References

Cricket administration in India
Cricket in Manipur
Sports organizations established in 1975
1975 establishments in Manipur
Organisations based in Manipur